The following outline is provided as an overview of and topical guide to North America.

North America is a continent in the Earth's Northern and Western Hemispheres. It is bordered on the north by the Arctic Ocean, on the east by the North Atlantic Ocean, on the southeast by the Caribbean Sea, and on the south and west by the North Pacific Ocean; South America lies to the southeast. As of July 2007, its population was estimated at nearly 524 million people. It is the third-largest continent in area, following Asia and Africa, and is fourth in population after Asia, Africa, and Europe. North America and South America are collectively known as the Americas.

Geography of North America 

Geography of North America
 Americas (terminology)
 Atlas of North America
 Continental divides of North America:
 Continental Divide of the Americas
 Eastern Continental Divide
 Laurentian Divide
 Extreme points of North America

Countries and dependencies of North America

Environment of North America

Regions of North America

Ecoregions of North America

Political divisions of North America

Geographic features of North America

Demography of North America

Geography by country and territory

Government and politics of North America

History of North America 

 History of the Americas
 History of Central America
 Voyages of Christopher Columbus
 Pre-Columbian trans-oceanic contact
 History of the west coast of North America
 European colonization of the Americas
 Timeline of colonization of North America

Culture of North America 

Culture of North America
 American (word)
 Etiquette in North America
 Etiquette in Canada and the United States
 Etiquette in Latin America
 Indigenous peoples of the Americas
 Languages of North America
 Anglo-America
 North American English
 World Heritage Sites in the Americas

The arts in North America

Sports in North America

Economy and infrastructure of North America

Education in North America

North America lists 
 List of newspapers
 Lists of radio stations in North America

See also 

 Anglo-America
 Continent
 Index of Central America-related articles
 Latin America
 List of Caribbean-related topics
 Lists of country-related topics
 Outline of South America

References

External links

 North America maps at World Atlas.com

North America
North America